The 2004 Toronto Blue Jays season was the franchise's 28th season of Major League Baseball. It resulted in the Blue Jays finishing fifth in the American League East with a record of 67 wins and 94 losses, their worst record since 1980. The Blue Jays' radio play-by-play announcer, Tom Cheek, called every Blue Jays game from the team's inaugural contest on April 7, 1977, until June 3, 2004, when he took two games off following the death of his father – a streak of 4,306 consecutive regular season games and 41 postseason games. It was the team's first season where Ace is the sole mascot, following the removal of Diamond at the end of the previous season.

Offseason
November 18, 2003: Ted Lilly was traded by the Oakland Athletics to the Toronto Blue Jays for Bobby Kielty.

Regular season

Summary
The 2004 season was a disappointing year for the Blue Jays right from the beginning. They started the season 0–8 at SkyDome and never started a lengthy winning streak. Much of that was due to injuries to All-Stars Carlos Delgado, Vernon Wells and Roy Halladay among others. Although the additions of starting pitchers Ted Lilly and Miguel Batista and reliever Justin Speier were relatively successful, veteran Pat Hentgen faltered throughout the season and retired on July 24. Rookies and minor league callups David Bush, Jason Frasor, Josh Towers and others filled the void in the rotation and the bullpen; however, inconsistent performances were evident. Most starting pitchers did not pitch further than the sixth inning; thus, the overused bullpen contributed to the frequent relinquishing of early scoring leads.

The offense really sputtered due to the injuries of Wells, Delgado, Catalanotto and others, although in their absence, Josh Phelps emerged as the team's go to guy, hitting 12 homers and driving in 51 runs before being limited to playing against left-handed pitching and was traded to the Cleveland Indians. Five different catchers were used: Greg Myers, Bobby Estalella, Kevin Cash, Gregg Zaun, and rookie Guillermo Quiróz. Greg Myers was injured running the bases in Minnesota, early in the season, and was lost for the year. Bobby Estalella was called up, but he proved to be brittle as well. Gregg Zaun landed the starting catching job for the rest of the season. Kevin Cash continued to struggle from an offensive standpoint and would be moved in the offseason. The highly touted Guillermo Quiróz was promoted from the minors near the end of the season.

With the team struggling in last place and mired in a five-game losing streak, manager Carlos Tosca was fired on August 8, 2004, and was replaced by first-base coach John Gibbons through the end of the season. The Jays' trying year would also touch long-time radio announcer Tom Cheek, who had to break his streak of calling all 4,306 regular season games in franchise history, upon the death of his father. Cheek had to take more time off later to remove a brain tumor, and by the end of the season, Cheek only called the home games.

Nevertheless, prospects Russ Adams, Gabe Gross, and Alex Ríos provided excitement for the fans. Adams hit his first major league home run in his second game, in which Gross also earned his own first major league grand slam. Alex Ríos was among the MLB Rookie of the Year Award candidates. However, the award went to Bobby Crosby of the Oakland Athletics. Rookie pitchers David Bush, Gustavo Chacín and Jason Frasor also showed promise for the club's future. The Blue Jays' lone MLB All-Star Game representative in 2004 was pitcher Ted Lilly.

On October 2, 2004, the Toronto Blue Jays announced the dismissals of pitching coach Gil Patterson and first-base coach Joe Breeden, effective at the end of the season. One day later, the Blue Jays finished the 2004 campaign with a 3–2 loss against the New York Yankees in front of an announced crowd of 49,948. However, the Jays' annus horribilis continued after the game, when it was announced that former pitcher and current TV broadcaster John Cerutti died suddenly of natural causes at the age of only 44.

More losses to the Jays family came in the offseason. Canadian Baseball Hall of Fame member Bobby Mattick, the manager from 1980 to 1981 and perhaps the best baseball man in the organization, suffered a stroke and died at the age of 89. Mattick had also served as the Vice President of Baseball Operations for the Blue Jays. A few days before Christmas, the Jays also mourned the loss of former first baseman Doug Ault, who had hit two home runs in the team's inaugural game in 1977; he was only 54 years old.

Rogers Communications, the owner of the Jays, purchased SkyDome from Sportsco International in November 2004 for approximately $25 million CAD ($21.24 million USD), just a fraction of the construction cost.

Just days after superstar Carlos Delgado became a free agent after the club refused arbitration, the Jays announced the signing of Manitoban third baseman Corey Koskie, formerly of the Minnesota Twins. One month after Koskie was inked, the Jays traded pitching prospect Adam Peterson to the Arizona Diamondbacks for corner infielder/DH Shea Hillenbrand.

Season standings

Record vs. opponents

Notable transactions
 April 9, 2004: Gregg Zaun was signed as a free agent with the Toronto Blue Jays.
 May 21, 2004: Bobby Estalella was signed as a free agent with the Toronto Blue Jays.
May 27, 2004: Marvin Benard was signed as a free agent with the Toronto Blue Jays.
June 7, 2004: Adam Lind was drafted by the Toronto Blue Jays in the 3rd round of the 2004 amateur draft. Player signed June 30, 2004.
September 2, 2004: Marvin Benard was released by the Toronto Blue Jays.

2004 Draft picks
Source 

The 2004 MLB draft was held on June 7–8. The Blue Jays had two compensation picks.

 * The Blue Jays received the 32nd pick as compensation for loss of free agent Kelvim Escobar
 * The Blue Jays received the 83rd pick from the Los Angeles Angels of Anaheim as compensation for signing of free agent Kelvim Escobar

Roster

Game log

|- align="center" bgcolor="ffbbbb"
| 1 || April 5 || Tigers || 7 – 0 || Johnson (1-0) || Halladay (0-1) || || 47,817 || 0-1
|- align="center" bgcolor="ffbbbb"
| 2 || April 6 || Tigers || 7 – 3 || Maroth (1-0) || Batista (0-1) || Robertson (1) || 21,003 || 0-2
|- align="center" bgcolor="ffbbbb"
| 3 || April 7 || Tigers || 6 – 3 || Bonderman (1-0) || Hentgen (0-1) || || 13,100 || 0-3
|- align="center" bgcolor="bbffbb"
| 4 || April 9 || @ Red Sox || 10 – 5 || Speier (1-0) || Timlin (0-1) || || 34,337 || 1-3
|- align="center" bgcolor="ffbbbb"
| 5 || April 10 || @ Red Sox || 4 – 1 || Martínez (1-1) || Halladay (0-2) || Foulke (2) || 35,305 || 1-4
|- align="center" bgcolor="ffbbbb"
| 6 || April 11 || @ Red Sox || 6 – 4 (12) || Malaska (1-0) || López (0-1)  || || 34,286 || 1-5
|- align="center" bgcolor="bbffbb"
| 7 || April 13 || @ Tigers || 7 – 5 || Adams (1-0) || Patterson (0-1) || Speier (1) || 8,804 || 2-5
|- align="center" bgcolor="ffbbbb"
| 8 || April 14 || @ Tigers || 5 – 3 || Robertson (1-0) || Lilly (0-1) || Patterson (1) || 15,129 || 2-6
|- align="center" bgcolor="bbffbb"
| 9 || April 15 || @ Tigers || 11 – 0 || Halladay (1-2) || Johnson (1-2) || || 17,572 || 3-6
|- align="center" bgcolor="ffbbbb"
| 10 || April 16 || Orioles || 11 – 2 || Riley (1-0) || Batista (0-2) || || 14,239 || 3-7
|- align="center" bgcolor="ffbbbb"
| 11 || April 17 || Orioles || 5 – 3 || Ryan (1-0) || Speier (1-1) || Julio (1) || 20,177 || 3-8
|- align="center" bgcolor="ffbbbb"
| 12 || April 18 || Orioles || 7 – 0 || DuBose (1-2) || Hentgen (0-2) || || 16,842 || 3-9
|- align="center" bgcolor="ffbbbb"
| 13 || April 20 || Red Sox || 4 – 2 || Martínez (2-1) || Halladay (1-3) || Foulke (4) || 26,010 || 3-10
|- align="center" bgcolor="ffbbbb"
| 14 || April 21 || Red Sox || 4 – 2 || Wakefield (2-0) || Lilly (0-2) || Foulke (5) || 16,163 || 3-11
|- align="center" bgcolor="bbffbb"
| 15 || April 22 || Red Sox || 7 – 3 || Adams (2-0) || Schilling (2-1) || || 16,480 || 4-11
|- align="center" bgcolor="ffbbbb"
| 16 || April 23 || @ Orioles || 11 – 3 || DuBose (2-2) || Towers (0-1) || || 26,827 || 4-12
|- align="center" bgcolor="bbffbb"
| 17 || April 24 || @ Orioles || 5 – 4 (12) || Ligtenberg (1-0) || DeJean (0-1) || || 41,093 || 5-12
|- align="center" bgcolor="bbffbb"
| 18 || April 25 || @ Orioles || 15 – 3 || Halladay (2-3) || Ponson (2-1) || || 31,028 || 6-12
|- align="center" bgcolor="bbffbb"
| 19 || April 26 || @ Twins || 6 – 1 || Lilly (1-2) || Radke (2-2) || || 13,859 || 7-12
|- align="center" bgcolor="ffbbbb"
| 20 || April 27 || @ Twins || 7 – 4 || Rincón (3-0) || Speier (1-2) || || 14,029 || 7-13
|- align="center" bgcolor="ffbbbb"
| 21 || April 28 || @ Twins || 9 – 5 || Rincón (4-0) || Frasor (0-1) || || 15,164 || 7-14
|- align="center" bgcolor="ffbbbb"
| 22 || April 29 || @ White Sox || 6 – 4 || Loaiza (4-0) || Nakamura (0-1) || Koch (2) || 11,210 || 7-15
|- align="center" bgcolor=#bbbbbb
| -- || April 30 || @ White Sox ||colspan=6|Postponed (rain) Rescheduled for May 1
|-

|- align="center" bgcolor="ffbbbb"
| 23 || May 1 || @ White Sox || 4 – 3 (10) || Takatsu (1-0) || Speier (1-3) || || || 7-16
|- align="center" bgcolor="bbffbb"
| 24 || May 1 || @ White Sox || 10 – 6 || Lilly (2-2) || Wright (0-4) || || 22,072 || 8-16
|- align="center" bgcolor="ffbbbb"
| 25 || May 2 || @ White Sox || 3 – 2 || Garland (2-1) || Batista (0-3) || Koch (3) || 15,550 || 8-17
|- align="center" bgcolor="ffbbbb"
| 26 || May 3 || Royals || 3 – 2 (10) || Field (1-0) || Adams (2-1) || Cerda (1) || 13,007 || 8-18
|- align="center" bgcolor="bbffbb"
| 27 || May 4 || Royals || 5 – 4 || Hentgen (1-2) || May (0-4) || Frasor (1) || 20,011 || 9-18
|- align="center" bgcolor="bbffbb"
| 28 || May 5 || Royals || 10 – 3 || Halladay (3-3) || Anderson (1-3) || || 14,103 || 10-18
|- align="center" bgcolor="bbffbb"
| 29 || May 7 || White Sox || 5 – 4 || Adams (3-1) || Politte (0-1) || || 15,661 || 11-18
|- align="center" bgcolor="bbffbb"
| 30 || May 8 || White Sox || 4 – 2 || Frasor (1-1) || Cotts (0-1) || Adams (1) || 18,368 || 12-18
|- align="center" bgcolor="bbffbb"
| 31 || May 9 || White Sox || 5 – 2 || Miller (1-0) || Loaiza (4-2) || Ligtenberg (1) || 17,546 || 13-18
|- align="center" bgcolor="bbffbb"
| 32 || May 10 || @ Royals || 9 – 3 || Hentgen (2-2) || Anderson (1-4) || || 13,803 || 14-18
|- align="center" bgcolor="ffbbbb"
| 33 || May 11 || @ Royals || 5 – 1 || Camp (2-0) || Halladay (3-4) || || 15,779 || 14-19
|- align="center" bgcolor="ffbbbb"
| 34 || May 12 || @ Royals || 4 – 3 || Field (2-0) || Adams (3-2) || || 29,309 || 14-20
|- align="center" bgcolor="bbffbb"
| 35 || May 13 || Red Sox || 12 – 6 || Batista (1-3) || Schilling (4-3) || || 20,876 || 15-20
|- align="center" bgcolor="ffbbbb"
| 36 || May 14 || Red Sox || 9 – 3 || Embree (2-0) || Ligtenberg (1-1) || || 20,948 || 15-21
|- align="center" bgcolor="ffbbbb"
| 37 || May 15 || Red Sox || 4 – 0 || Arroyo (2-1) || Hentgen (2-3) || || 36,841 || 15-22
|- align="center" bgcolor="bbffbb"
| 38 || May 16 || Red Sox || 3 – 1 || Halladay (4-4) || Martínez (4-3) || Adams (2) || 31,618 || 16-22
|- align="center" bgcolor="ffbbbb"
| 39 || May 17 || Twins || 9 – 5 || Rincón (6-2) || Nakamura (0-2) || Fultz (1) || 13,502 || 16-23
|- align="center" bgcolor="bbffbb"
| 40 || May 18 || Twins || 5 – 3 || Batista (2-3) || Santana (2-1) || Adams (3) || 25,405 || 17-23
|- align="center" bgcolor="ffbbbb"
| 41 || May 19 || Twins || 6 – 5 || Fultz (2-1) || Adams (3-3) || Nathan (13) || 25,675 || 17-24
|- align="center" bgcolor="ffbbbb"
| 42 || May 21 || @ Red Sox || 11 – 5 || Timlin (3-1) || Nakamura (0-3) || || 35,287 || 17-25
|- align="center" bgcolor="ffbbbb"
| 43 || May 22 || @ Red Sox || 5 – 2 || Martínez (1-0) || Ligtenberg (1-2) || Foulke (9) || 35,196 || 17-26
|- align="center" bgcolor="ffbbbb"
| 44 || May 23 || @ Red Sox || 7 – 2 || Wakefield (4-2) || Batista (2-4) || || 35,239 || 17-27
|- align="center" bgcolor="bbffbb"
| 45 || May 24 || Angels || 6 – 5 (10)|| Frasor (2-1) || Weber (0-2) || || 15,301 || 18-27
|- align="center" bgcolor="bbffbb"
| 46 || May 26 || Angels || 6 – 5 || Adams (4-3) || Percival (2-1) || || 14,515 || 19-27
|- align="center" bgcolor="bbffbb"
| 47 || May 27 || Angels || 3 – 2 || Halladay (5-4) || Washburn (7-2) || Frasor (2) || 14,773 || 20-27
|- align="center" bgcolor="bbffbb"
| 48 || May 28 || Rangers || 5 – 4 || Lilly (3-2) || Dickey (4-5) || Frasor (3) || 16,394 || 21-27
|- align="center" bgcolor="bbffbb"
| 49 || May 29 || Rangers || 6 – 2 || Batista (3-4) || Dominguez (0-1) || || 30,704 || 22-27
|- align="center" bgcolor="ffbbbb"
| 50 || May 30 || Rangers || 4 – 2 || Rogers (8-2) || Miller (1-1) || Cordero (16) || 22,225 || 22-28
|- align="center" bgcolor="ffbbbb"
| 51 || May 31 || @ Mariners || 6 – 2 || Moyer (4-2) || Hentgen (2-4) || || 27,856 || 22-29
|-

|- align="center" bgcolor="bbffbb"
| 52 || June 1 || @ Mariners || 6 – 5 || López (1-1) || Nageotte (0-1) || Frasor (4) || 24,848 || 23-29
|- align="center" bgcolor="bbffbb"
| 53 || June 2 || @ Mariners || 5 – 3 || Lilly (4-2) || Piñeiro (1-7) || Ligtenberg (2) || 25,317 || 24-29
|- align="center" bgcolor="ffbbbb"
| 54 || June 3 || @ Athletics || 2 – 1 (11)|| Bradford (3-1) || Adams (4-4) || || 10,879 || 24-30
|- align="center" bgcolor="bbffbb"
| 55 || June 4 || @ Athletics || 6 – 1 || Towers (1-1) || Bradford (3-2) || Chulk (1) || 12,822 || 25-30
|- align="center" bgcolor="ffbbbb"
| 56 || June 5 || @ Athletics || 4 – 0 || Hudson (6-2) || Hentgen (2-5) || || 20,772 || 25-31
|- align="center" bgcolor="ffbbbb"
| 57 || June 6 || @ Athletics || 8 – 3 || Redman (4-3) || Kershner (0-1) || || 24,092 || 25-32
|- align="center" bgcolor="bbffbb"
| 58 || June 8 || Dodgers || 7 – 1 || Lilly (5-2) || Nomo (3-6) || || 16,499 || 26-32
|- align="center" bgcolor="bbffbb"
| 59 || June 9 || Dodgers || 4 – 0 || Batista (4-4) || Lima (4-2) || || 18,003 || 27-32
|- align="center" bgcolor="ffbbbb"
| 60 || June 10 || Dodgers || 6 – 1 || Ishii (8-3) || Towers (1-2) || || 16,267 || 27-33
|- align="center" bgcolor="ffbbbb"
| 61 || June 11 || Diamondbacks || 3 – 2 || Choate (1-0) || Frasor (2-2) || Valverde (7) || 14,259 || 27-34
|- align="center" bgcolor="bbffbb"
| 62 || June 12 || Diamondbacks || 15 – 4 || Halladay (6-4) || Good (0-1) || Chulk (2) || 30,349 || 28-34
|- align="center" bgcolor="ffbbbb"
| 63 || June 13 || Diamondbacks || 5 – 3 || Johnson (9-4) || Lilly (5-3) || Valverde (8) || 22,766 || 28-35
|- align="center" bgcolor="ffbbbb"
| 64 || June 15 || @ Giants || 4 – 3 || Schmidt (8-2) || Batista (4-5) || Herges (17) || 36,737 || 28-36
|- align="center" bgcolor="ffbbbb"
| 65 || June 16 || @ Giants || 10 – 2 || Rueter (3-6) || Hentgen (2-6) || || 36,834 || 28-37
|- align="center" bgcolor="ffbbbb"
| 66 || June 17 || @ Giants || 8 – 5 || Brower (4-3) || Speier (1-4) || Herges (18) || 40,464 || 28-38
|- align="center" bgcolor="bbffbb"
| 67 || June 18 || @ Padres || 3 – 2 || Lilly (6-3) || Wells (2-5) || Frasor (5) || 40,511 || 29-38
|- align="center" bgcolor="ffbbbb"
| 68 || June 19 || @ Padres || 3 – 2 || Linebrink (3-1) || Speier (1-5) || Hoffman (15) || 40,307 || 29-39
|- align="center" bgcolor="bbffbb"
| 69 || June 20 || @ Padres || 3 – 0 || Batista (5-5) || Lawrence (8-5) || Frasor (6) || 41,060 || 30-39
|- align="center" bgcolor="ffbbbb"
| 70 || June 22 || Devil Rays || 5 – 1 || Harper (2-0) || Hentgen (2-7) || || 15,646 || 30-40
|- align="center" bgcolor="bbffbb"
| 71 || June 23 || Devil Rays || 2 – 1 (10)|| Frasor (3-2) || Colomé (1-1) || || 14,713 || 31-40
|- align="center" bgcolor="ffbbbb"
| 72 || June 24 || Devil Rays || 19 – 13 || Halama (4-1) || Lilly (6-4) || || 14,876 || 31-41
|- align="center" bgcolor="bbffbb"
| 73 || June 25 || Expos || 3 – 1 || Towers (2-2) || Day (5-8) || Frasor (7) || 16,484 || 32-41
|- align="center" bgcolor="bbffbb"
| 74 || June 26 || Expos || 10 – 5 || Batista (6-5) || Downs (0-1) || || 23,875 || 33-41
|- align="center" bgcolor="ffbbbb"
| 75 || June 27 || Expos || 9 – 4 || Hernández (5-7) || Hentgen (2-8) || || 25,915 || 33-42
|- align="center" bgcolor="ffbbbb"
| 76 || June 28 || @ Devil Rays || 10 – 2 || Zambrano (8-4) || Halladay (6-5) || || 11,218 || 33-43
|- align="center" bgcolor="bbffbb"
| 77 || June 29 || @ Devil Rays || 4 – 0 || Lilly (7-4) || Halama (4-2) || || 11,640 || 34-43
|- align="center" bgcolor="ffbbbb"
| 78 || June 30 || @ Devil Rays || 6 – 2 || Brazelton (2-0) || Towers (2-3) || || 10,560 || 34-44
|-

|- align="center" bgcolor="bbffbb"
| 79 || July 1 || @ Devil Rays || 14 – 0 || Batista (7-5) || Hendrickson (5-6) || || 14,417 || 35-44
|- align="center" bgcolor="ffbbbb"
| 80 || July 2 || @ Expos † || 2 – 0 || Hernández (6-7) || Bush (0-1) || || 8,220 || 35-45
|- align="center" bgcolor="bbffbb"
| 81 || July 3 || @ Expos † || 2 – 0 || Halladay (7-5) || Armas (1-3) || Frasor (8) || 8,831 || 36-45
|- align="center" bgcolor="ffbbbb"
| 82 || July 4 || @ Expos † || 6 – 4 || Hill (1-1) || Lilly (7-5) || Horgan (1) || 8,279 || 36-46
|- align="center" bgcolor="bbffbb"
| 83 || July 6 || Mariners || 7 – 6 || Batista (8-5) || Moyer (6-5) || Frasor (9) || 16,262 || 37-46
|- align="center" bgcolor="bbffbb"
| 84 || July 7 || Mariners || 12 – 4 || Towers (3-3) || Blackley (1-1) || || 18,513 || 38-46
|- align="center" bgcolor="bbffbb"
| 85 || July 8 || Mariners || 10 – 8 || Speier (2-5) || Guardado (2-1) || || 16,188 || 39-46
|- align="center" bgcolor="ffbbbb"
| 86 || July 9 || Angels || 5 – 4 || Colón (6-8) || Halladay (7-6) || Percival (14) || 15,071 || 39-47
|- align="center" bgcolor="ffbbbb"
| 87 || July 10 || Angels || 11 – 2 || Escobar (5-5) || Lilly (7-6) || || 20,635 || 39-48
|- align="center" bgcolor="ffbbbb"
| 88 || July 11 || Angels || 5 – 2 || Lackey (7-8) || Batista (8-6) || Percival (15) || 17,573 || 39-49
|- align="center" bgcolor="ffbbbb"
| 89 || July 16 || @ Rangers || 11 – 2 || Drese (5-5) || Halladay (7-7) || || 44,348 || 39-50
|- align="center" bgcolor="ffbbbb"
| 90 || July 17 || @ Rangers || 4 – 0 || Rodríguez (3-0) || Lilly (7-7) || || 43,189 || 39-51
|- align="center" bgcolor="ffbbbb"
| 91 || July 18 || @ Rangers || 7 – 5 || Brocail (1-1) || Chulk (0-1) || Cordero (28) || 24,334 || 39-52
|- align="center" bgcolor="bbffbb"
| 92 || July 19 || @ Athletics || 5 – 3 || Towers (4-3) || Saarloos (1-1) || Frasor (10) || 15,480 || 40-52
|- align="center" bgcolor="ffbbbb"
| 93 || July 20 || @ Athletics || 1 – 0 (14)|| Lehr (1-1) || Speier (2-6) || || 18,885 || 40-53
|- align="center" bgcolor="ffbbbb"
| 94 || July 21 || @ Yankees || 10 – 3 || Vázquez (11-6) || Hentgen (2-9) || || 53,031 || 40-54
|- align="center" bgcolor="ffbbbb"
| 95 || July 22 || @ Yankees || 1 – 0 || Rivera (1-0) || Chulk (0-2) || || 53,657 || 40-55
|- align="center" bgcolor="bbffbb"
| 96 || July 23 || Devil Rays || 7 – 4 || Batista (9-6) || Hendrickson (7-8) || Frasor (11) || 16,633 || 41-55
|- align="center" bgcolor="bbffbb"
| 97 || July 24 || Devil Rays || 4 – 2 || Towers (5-3) || Bell (3-4) || Frasor (12) || 18,841 || 42-55
|- align="center" bgcolor="bbffbb"
| 98 || July 25 || Devil Rays || 5 – 3 || Bush (1-1) || Zambrano (9-7) || Ligtenberg (3) || 15,784 || 43-55
|- align="center" bgcolor="ffbbbb"
| 99 || July 26 || Yankees || 6 – 5 (10)|| Rivera (2-1) || Frasor (3-3) || || 30,041 || 43-56
|- align="center" bgcolor="ffbbbb"
| 100 || July 27 || Yankees || 7 – 4 || Proctor (1-0) || Ligtenberg (1-3) || Gordon (3) || 30,087 || 43-57
|- align="center" bgcolor="bbffbb"
| 101 || July 28 || Yankees || 3 – 2 (10)|| Frasor (4-3) || Proctor (1-1) || || 31,385 || 44-57
|- align="center" bgcolor="bbffbb"
| 102 || July 30 || @ Devil Rays || 3 – 0 || Towers (6-3) || Halama (5-5) || Frasor (13) || 10,531 || 45-57
|- align="center" bgcolor="ffbbbb"
| 103 || July 31 || @ Devil Rays || 6 – 5 || Sosa (3-0) || Bush (1-2) || Báez (21) || 17,418 || 45-58
|-

|- align="center" bgcolor="ffbbbb"
| 104 || August 1 || @ Devil Rays || 5 – 3 || Brazelton (4-3) || Douglass (0-1) || Báez (22) || 10,750 || 45-59
|- align="center" bgcolor="bbffbb"
| 105 || August 2 || Indians || 6 – 1 || Lilly (8-7) || Lee (10-4) || || 17,549 || 46-59
|- align="center" bgcolor="bbffbb"
| 106 || August 3 || Indians || 7 – 6 || Speier (3-6) || Betancourt (4-5) || Frasor (14) || 15,025 || 47-59
|- align="center" bgcolor="ffbbbb"
| 107 || August 4 || Indians || 14 – 5 || Westbrook (9-5) || Towers (6-4) || || 15,675 || 47-60
|- align="center" bgcolor="ffbbbb"
| 108 || August 5 || Indians || 6 – 3 (10)|| Betancourt (5-5) || Ligtenberg (1-4) || Wickman (2) || 30,037 || 47-61
|- align="center" bgcolor="ffbbbb"
| 109 || August 6 || @ Yankees || 11 – 4 || Vázquez (13-6) || Douglass (0-2) || || 48,900 || 47-62
|- align="center" bgcolor="ffbbbb"
| 110 || August 7 || @ Yankees || 6 – 0 || Hernández (4-0) || Lilly (8-8) || || 54,025 || 47-63
|- align="center" bgcolor="ffbbbb"
| 111 || August 8 || @ Yankees || 8 – 2 || Lieber (8-7) || Batista (9-7) || || 52,616 || 47-64
|- align="center" bgcolor="bbffbb"
| 112 || August 9 || @ Yankees || 5 – 4 || Towers (7-4) || Loaiza (9-6) || Frasor (15) || 49,853 || 48-64
|- align="center" bgcolor="ffbbbb"
| 113 || August 10 || @ Indians || 2 – 0 || Durbin (5-4) || Bush (1-3) || Wickman (5) || 19,942 || 48-65
|- align="center" bgcolor="ffbbbb"
| 114 || August 11 || @ Indians || 3 – 2 || Sabathia (9-6) || Frederick (0-1) || Wickman (6) || 23,696 || 48-66
|- align="center" bgcolor="ffbbbb"
| 115 || August 12 || @ Indians || 6 – 2 || Riske (6-2) || Ligtenberg (1-5) || || 22,734 || 48-67
|- align="center" bgcolor="ffbbbb"
| 116 || August 13 || Orioles || 4 – 0 || Ponson (8-12) || Batista (9-8) || || 21,234 || 48-68
|- align="center" bgcolor="bbffbb"
| 117 || August 14 || Orioles || 7 – 2 || Towers (8-4) || Borkowski (3-3) || || 35,768 || 49-68
|- align="center" bgcolor="ffbbbb"
| 118 || August 15 || Orioles || 11 – 7 || Groom (3-0) || Chulk (0-3) || || 26,132 || 49-69
|- align="center" bgcolor="ffbbbb"
| 119 || August 16 || @ Red Sox || 8 – 4 || Lowe (11-10) || Miller (1-2) || Foulke (20) || 35,271 || 49-70
|- align="center" bgcolor="ffbbbb"
| 120 || August 17 || @ Red Sox || 5 – 4 || Foulke (3-3) || Frederick (0-2) || || 35,105 || 49-71
|- align="center" bgcolor="ffbbbb"
| 121 || August 18 || @ Red Sox || 6 – 4 || Wakefield (9-7) || Batista (9-9) || || 34,867 || 49-72
|- align="center" bgcolor="bbffbb"
| 122 || August 20 || @ Orioles || 14 – 4 || Towers (9-4) || Borkowski (3-4) || || 35,024 || 50-72
|- align="center" bgcolor="bbffbb"
| 123 || August 21 || @ Orioles || 10 – 4 || Bush (2-3) || Cabrera (9-6) || || 38,079 || 51-72
|- align="center" bgcolor="bbffbb"
| 124 || August 22 || @ Orioles || 8 – 5 || Miller (2-2) || Bédard (5-8) || Frasor (16) || 44,482 || 52-72
|- align="center" bgcolor="bbffbb"
| 125 || August 23 || Red Sox || 3 – 0 || Lilly (9-8) || Martínez (13-5) || || 27,145 || 53-72
|- align="center" bgcolor="ffbbbb"
| 126 || August 24 || Red Sox || 5 – 4 || Wakefield (10-7) || Batista (9-10) || Foulke (23) || 22,217 || 53-73
|- align="center" bgcolor="ffbbbb"
| 127 || August 25 || Red Sox || 11 – 5 || Schilling (16-6) || Towers (9-5) || || 22,479 || 53-74
|- align="center" bgcolor="ffbbbb"
| 128 || August 26 || Yankees || 7 – 4 || Nitkowski (1-1) || Frasor (4-4) || Rivera (44) || 35,682 || 53-75
|- align="center" bgcolor="ffbbbb"
| 129 || August 27 || Yankees || 8 – 7 || Sturtze (5-2) || Miller (2-3) || Gordon (4) || 35,436 || 53-76
|- align="center" bgcolor="ffbbbb"
| 130 || August 28 || Yankees || 18 – 6 || Brown (10-3) || Lilly (9-9) || Rivera (45) || 43,541 || 53-77
|- align="center" bgcolor="bbffbb"
| 131 || August 29 || Yankees || 6 – 4 || Batista (10-10) || Mussina (9-8) || Frasor (17) || 44,072 || 54-77
|- align="center" bgcolor="ffbbbb"
| 132 || August 31 || Mariners || 7 – 5 || Atchison (2-2) || Ligtenberg (1-6) || Putz (6) || 21,174 || 54-78
|-

|- align="center" bgcolor="bbffbb"
| 133 || September 1 || Mariners || 4 – 2 || Bush (3-3) || Villone (5-5) || Speier (2) || 22,310 || 55-78
|- align="center" bgcolor="bbffbb"
| 134 || September 2 || Mariners || 8 – 6 || File (1-0) || Baek (1-1) || Speier (3) || 23,374 || 56-78
|- align="center" bgcolor="ffbbbb"
| 135 || September 3 || Athletics || 7 – 4 || Hudson (11-4) || Lilly (9-10) || Dotel (18) || 28,488 || 56-79
|- align="center" bgcolor="ffbbbb"
| 136 || September 4 || Athletics || 9 – 5 || Hammond (4-1) || Frasor (4-5) || || 29,149 || 56-80
|- align="center" bgcolor="bbffbb"
| 137 || September 5 || Athletics || 13 – 5 || Glynn (1-0) || Harden (9-6) || || 28,327 || 57-80
|- align="center" bgcolor="ffbbbb"
| 138 || September 7 || @ Angels || 5 – 2 || Colón (14-11) || Bush (3-4) || Percival (27) || 36,277 || 57-81
|- align="center" bgcolor="bbffbb"
| 139 || September 8 || @ Angels || 1 – 0 || Miller (3-3) || Escobar (9-10) || Speier (4) || 36,905 || 58-81
|- align="center" bgcolor="bbffbb"
| 140 || September 9 || @ Angels || 5 – 4 || Lilly (10-10) || Washburn (11-6) || Speier (5) || 37,514 || 59-81
|- align="center" bgcolor="ffbbbb"
| 141 || September 10 || @ Rangers || 10 – 3 || Drese (12-8) || Batista (10-11) || || 24,617 || 59-82
|- align="center" bgcolor="ffbbbb"
| 142 || September 11 || @ Rangers || 10 – 7 || Mahay (3-0) || Frasor (4-6) || Cordero (43) || 40,587 || 59-83
|- align="center" bgcolor="ffbbbb"
| 143 || September 12 || @ Rangers || 7 – 6 || Brocail (3-1) || Speier (3-7) || Cordero (44) || 20,434 || 59-84
|- align="center" bgcolor="ffbbbb"
| 144 || September 13 || Orioles || 9 – 1 || Chen (1-0) || Miller (3-4) || || 18,372 || 59-85
|- align="center" bgcolor="bbffbb"
| 145 || September 15 || Orioles || 3 – 0 || Lilly (11-10) || Riley (1-4) || Speier (6) || 19,942 || 60-85
|- align="center" bgcolor="ffbbbb"
| 146 || September 16 || Orioles || 9 – 5 || López (13-8) || Batista (10-12) || || 21,451 || 60-86
|- align="center" bgcolor="ffbbbb"
| 147 || September 17 || Devil Rays || 11 – 4 || Waechter (4-7) || Towers (9-6) || || 25,987 || 60-87
|- align="center" bgcolor="bbffbb"
| 148 || September 18 || Devil Rays || 4 – 2 || Bush (4-4) || Ritchie (0-1) || Batista (1) || 33,432 || 61-87
|- align="center" bgcolor="bbffbb"
| 149 || September 19 || Devil Rays || 9 – 7 || Chulk (1-3) || Kazmir (2-2) || Speier (7) || 30,714 || 62-87
|- align="center" bgcolor="bbffbb"
| 150 || September 20 || @ Yankees || 6 – 3 || Chacín (1-0) || Vázquez (14-10) || Batista (2) || 10,732 || 63-87
|- align="center" bgcolor="ffbbbb"
| 151 || September 21 || @ Yankees || 5 – 3 || Loaiza (10-7) || Halladay (7-8) || Rivera (50) || 36,675 || 63-88
|- align="center" bgcolor="bbffbb"
| 152 || September 22 || @ Yankees || 5 – 4 || Lilly (12-10) || Hernández (8-1) || Batista (3) || 49,560 || 64-88
|- align="center" bgcolor="ffbbbb"
| 153 || September 24 || @ Devil Rays || 4 – 2 || Hendrickson (10-15) || Towers (9-7) || Báez (29) || 13,003 || 64-89
|- align="center" bgcolor="ffbbbb"
| 154 || September 25 || @ Devil Rays || 6 – 5 || Báez (4-3) || Batista (10-13) || || 20,978 || 64-90
|- align="center" bgcolor=#bbbbbb
| -- || September 26 || @ Devil Rays ||colspan=6|Postponed (rain) Not rescheduled
|- align="center" bgcolor="bbffbb"
| 155 || September 27 || @ Orioles || 4 – 1 || League (1-0) || Ponson (11-15) || Batista (4) || 17,809 || 65-90
|- align="center" bgcolor=#bbbbbb
| -- || September 28 || @ Orioles ||colspan=6|Postponed (rain) Rescheduled for September 29
|- align="center" bgcolor="ffbbbb"
| 156 || September 29 || @ Orioles || 7 – 6 || Ryan (4-6) || Speier(3-8) || || || 65-91
|- align="center" bgcolor="ffbbbb"
| 157 || September 29 || @ Orioles || 4 – 0 || Bauer (2-1) || Chacín (1-1) || || 20,600 || 65-92
|- align="center" bgcolor="ffbbbb"
| 158 || September 30 || @ Orioles || 9 – 3 || Riley (3-4) || Towers (9-8) || || 18,793 || 65-93
|-

|- align="center" bgcolor="bbffbb"
| 159 || October 1 || Yankees || 7 – 0 || Bush (5-4) || Hernández (8-2) || || 48,914 || 66-93
|- align="center" bgcolor="bbffbb"
| 160 || October 2 || Yankees || 4 – 2 || Halladay (8-8) || Brown (10-6) || Batista (5) || 50,498 || 67-93
|- align="center" bgcolor="ffbbbb"
| 161 || October 3 || Yankees || 3 – 2 || Proctor (2-1) || Towers (9-9) || Sturtze (1) || 49,948 || 67-94
|-

|  † At Hiram Bithorn Stadium in San Juan, Puerto Rico.

Player stats

Batting

Starters by position
Note: Pos = Position; G = Games played; AB = At bats; H = Hits; Avg. = Batting average; HR = Home runs; RBI = Runs batted in

Other batters
Note: G = Games played; AB = At bats; H = Hits; Avg. = Batting average; HR = Home runs; RBI = Runs batted in

Pitching

Starting pitchers
Note: G = Games pitched; IP = Innings pitched; W = Wins; L = Losses; ERA = Earned run average; SO = Strikeouts

Other pitchers
Note: G = Games pitched; IP = Innings pitched; W = Wins; L = Losses; ERA = Earned run average; SO = Strikeouts

Relief pitchers
Note: G = Games pitched; W = Wins; L = Losses; SV = Saves; ERA = Earned run average; SO = Strikeouts

Award winners
Vernon Wells, Gold Glove Award
All-Star Game
 Ted Lilly, pitcher

Farm system

LEAGUE CHAMPIONS: New Hampshire

References

External links
2004 Toronto Blue Jays at Baseball Reference
2004 Toronto Blue Jays at Baseball Almanac

Toronto Blue Jays seasons
Toronto Blue Jays season
2004 in Canadian sports
2004 in Toronto